Florian Ruck (born 6 February 1992) is a German footballer who plays as a defender and is currently a free agent.

References

External links
 

German footballers
1992 births
Living people
TSG 1899 Hoffenheim II players
SC Paderborn 07 players
Association football defenders
2. Bundesliga players
3. Liga players
People from Bad Mergentheim
Sportspeople from Stuttgart (region)
Footballers from Baden-Württemberg